Dalonte Hill (born January 19, 1979) is an American basketball coach. He is currently an assistant coach at Stephen F. Austin. Prior to that, he was an assistant college basketball coach at The University of Maryland. He was hired to join head coach Mark Turgeon's staff in May 2011.

Prior to his hiring at Maryland, Hill served as an assistant under Kansas State head coach Frank Martin. 
In August 2010, Kansas State athletic director John Currie extended Hill's contract through 2015 and increased his salary to $423,750. His previous contract, worth $420,000 a year, had made him the highest paid assistant coach in college basketball. In addition, Hill was eligible for a bonus of $80,000 based on the success of his team.

Hill, a Washington, D.C. native, coached the AAU team DC Assault for two years prior to being hired at
Charlotte, where he was an assistant coach from 2003 to 2005.

Hill has had two run in's with the law, both times being arrested on suspicion of DUI.  One of the arrests came while Hill was in Kansas and the other while he was at Maryland.

On November 27, 2013, Hill resigned as assistant coach for the Terps, effective immediately.

About 3 1/2 years after resigning from Maryland, Hill was hired as assistant coach at Austin Peay under new head coach Matt Figger in May 2017.

References

External links
 Austin Peay profile

Place of birth missing (living people)
1979 births
Living people
American men's basketball coaches
American men's basketball players
Austin Peay Governors men's basketball coaches
Basketball coaches from Washington, D.C.
Basketball players from Washington, D.C.
Bowie State Bulldogs men's basketball players
Charlotte 49ers men's basketball coaches
Charlotte 49ers men's basketball players
Kansas State Wildcats men's basketball coaches
Maryland Terrapins men's basketball coaches